This article presents a list of the historical events and publications of Australian literature during 1980.

Events

The Australian/Vogel Literary Award: Inaugural award to Archie Weller, The Day Of The Dog; the award was initially given to Paul Radley, who, in 1996, admitted that his manuscript was actually written by his uncle.
 Jessica Anderson won the 1980 Miles Franklin Award for The Impersonators

Major publications

Books 
 Jessica Anderson – The Impersonators
 Peter Corris – The Dying Trade
 Shirley Hazzard – The Transit of Venus
 Elizabeth Jolley – Palomino

Short story collections
 Helen Garner – Honour & Other People's Children

Children's and Young Adult fiction 
 Mavis Thorpe Clark – A Stranger Came to the Mine
 Robert Ingpen — The Voyage of the Poppykettle
 Ruth Park — Playing Beatie Bow

Poetry 
 Judith Rodriguez – Mudcrab at Gambaro's
 Philip Salom – The Silent Piano
 Chris Wallace-Crabbe, editor, The Golden Apples of the Sun: Twentieth Century Australian Poetry (anthology)

Drama 
 Louis Nowra – Beauty and the Beast
 Steve J. Spears – The Time of the Bodgie
 David Williamson – Celluloid Heroes

Non-fiction 
 Robyn Davidson – Tracks
 Clive James – Unreliable Memoirs

Awards and honours

 Kylie Tennant – Officer of the Order of Australia (AO)
 Max Fatchen – Member of the Order of Australia (AM)
 Marjorie Barnard – Medal of the Order of Australia (OAM)
 Patsy Adam-Smith – Officer of the British Empire (OBE)

Lifetime achievement

Literary

Children and Young Adult

Poetry

Births 
A list, ordered by date of birth (and, if the date is either unspecified or repeated, ordered alphabetically by surname) of births in 1980 of Australian literary figures, authors of written works or literature-related individuals follows, including year of death.

 7 July – Brooke Davis, novelist

Unknown date
 Elizabeth Campbell, poet
 Ceridwen Dovey, novelist

Deaths 
A list, ordered by date of death (and, if the date is either unspecified or repeated, ordered alphabetically by surname) of deaths in 1980 of Australian literary figures, authors of written works or literature-related individuals follows, including year of birth.

 2 September – Frederick Macartney, poet and critic (born 1887)
 3 February – Marnie Bassett, historian and biographer (born 1889)

See also 
 1980 in Australia
 1980 in literature
 1980 in poetry
 List of years in literature
 List of years in Australian literature

References

 
Australian literature by year
20th-century Australian literature
1980 in literature